Blockley railway station served the village of Blockley, Gloucestershire, England from 1853 to 1966 on the Oxford, Worcester and Wolverhampton Railway.

History 
The station opened on 4 June 1853 by the Oxford, Worcester and Wolverhampton Railway. It closed on 3 January 1966 and was demolished shortly after.

References

External links 

Disused railway stations in Gloucestershire
Railway stations opened in 1853
Railway stations closed in 1966
1853 establishments in England
1966 disestablishments in England

Railway stations in Great Britain opened in 1853